A relief is a sculpture where a modelled form projects from a flat background.

Relief may also refer to:

Other common meanings
 Relief (emotion)
 Relief (military)
 Relief (humanitarian)

Places

Antarctica
 Relief Inlet, Victoria Land
 Relief Pass, a mountain pass in Oates Land

United States
 Relief, California, an unincorporated community
 Relief, Kentucky, an unincorporated community
 Relief, North Carolina, an unincorporated community
 Relief, Ohio, an unincorporated community
 Relief, Washington, a community

Arts, entertainment, and media

Music
 Relief (music), the curvature of the neck of a guitar or similar instrument allowing the strings to vibrate freely
 Relief (album), 2013 debut studio album by American rapper Mike Stud
 Relief, 1998 album by Pope Jane
 Relief, 2010 album by Finnish band Magenta Skycode
 "Relief", a song by American band Cold War Kids from their 2008 album Loyalty to Loyalty

Other arts, entertainment, and media
 RelieF, a Canadian news television series
Relief pitcher, a baseball or softball position
Bas relief, a projecting image with a shallow overall depth

Ships
 Relief (sternwheeler), a steamboat that operated on the Willamette River, in Oregon, U.S., in the mid-1800s
 United States lightship Relief (WAL-605), a former Coast Guard lightship launched in 1950 and out of service in 1976
 USS Relief, several U.S. Navy ships

Terrain
 Relief generation, a set of landforms
 Topographic relief, the variation in elevation of a landscape
 Shaded relief in terrain cartography

Other uses
 Relief (feature selection), a feature selection algorithm
 Relief valve, a safety valve designed to open in overpressurized system conditions
 Debt relief, the partial or total "lifting-back" or forgiveness of debt
 Feudal relief, a payment to an overlord by the heir of a feudal tenant to license him to take possession of his inheritance
 Judicial relief, or legal remedy
 Optical relief, a concept in optical mineralogy
 Poor relief, historical name, prior to the era of the welfare state, for official methods of poverty alleviation 
 Quasar Relief, a Czech competition hang glider design